Lelep is a village development committee in the Himalayas of Taplejung District in the Province No. 1 of north-eastern Nepal. At the time of the 2011 Nepal census it had a population of 2,205 people living in 511 individual households. There were 1,122 males and 1,083 females at the time of census. It is currently a part of Phaktanglung Rural Municipality.

References

External links
UN map of the municipalities of Taplejung District

Populated places in Taplejung District